The Lanna Folklife Museum is a museum in Chiang Mai, Thailand. The museum is dedicated to the culture of Northern Thailand.

History 
The building once belonged to the eighth ruler of Chiang Mai, Chao Inthawarorot Suriyawongse. The building was used as a Provincial Courthouse dating from 1935. The Department of Treasury and the Court of Justice decided to renovate the building into a museum. In 2012, the museum opened for the first time.

Collections 
The museum contains Buddhist art, ceremonial utensils, handicrafts, sculptures, ceramics and paintings of the Lanna culture. The museum includes exhibits on lai krahm pottery as well as dioramas. The museum contains information about Lanna traditions, including dances such as fon lep. The museum has artifacts such as ceremonial wooden betel sets. The museum contains exhibits on religious ritual artifacts, sculptures dating back to the Lanna period, mural paintings, Buddhist relics, lacquerware, woven basketry, traditional musical instruments. The museum also includes artifacts made of wax. In 2019, the museum presented an exhibition of Phra Upakut amulet statues made of different materials such as wood, stone, bronze, silver and gold, this exhibition also featured Pa Sin Tin Joks, which are traditional skirts worn by Northern Thai people.

Gallery

References 

Museums in Chiang Mai
2012 establishments in Thailand
Museums established in 2012
Folk museums in Asia
Buildings and structures in Chiang Mai